Neil Slatter is a Welsh former professional footballer, who played at left back. He began his career with Bristol Rovers in 1980, where he remained for five years before moving on to Oxford United. He also had a loan spell with AFC Bournemouth in 1990, and ended his career after making a single appearance for Gloucester City.

Rise to fame

At the age of 16 Slatter furthered his career by being spotted and being chosen to play for the Wales national football team along with Ian Rush and Mark Hughes. Slatter became the youngest player to represent Wales at that time. In all, he was capped 21 times for his country.

Health Issues

Slatter suffered a severe knee injury which ended his career in 1991 at the age of 27.

References 

Living people
1964 births
Welsh footballers
Wales international footballers
Bristol Rovers F.C. players
Gloucester City A.F.C. players
Oxford United F.C. players
AFC Bournemouth players
Association football defenders